Oberea nigriceps is a species of beetle in the family Cerambycidae. It was described by White in 1844.

References

Beetles described in 1844
nigriceps